Kudsi Erguner (born 4 February 1952 in Diyarbakır, Turkey) is a Turkish musician. He is considered a master of traditional Mevlevi Sufi music and is one of the best-known players of the Turkish ney flute.

Biography 
As a boy, Erguner studied with his father Ulvi Erguner and attended the Sema of the Mevlevi-Sufi tradition along with other Dervish ceremonies. He started his musical career in Istanbul Radio in 1969. For several decades, he has researched the earliest roots of Ottoman music which he has also taught, performed and recorded.

In the seventies Erguner moved to Paris where, at the beginning of the eighties, he founded the Mevlana Institute devoted to the study and teaching of classical Sufi music. Together with the Kudsi Erguner Ensemble he developed deep insights into the diversity of his culture: the group conveys both authentic, often improvised forms of expression of classical Ottoman performance culture as well as a comprehensive repertoire of modern and classical pieces that can be traced back to the 13th century.

He took part in Peter Brook's movie Meetings with Remarkable Men in 1978.

In addition to his own recordings, Erguner has performed with Peter Gabriel (The Last Temptation of Christ soundtrack), William Orbit's band Bassomatic (Set the Controls for the Heart of the Bass), Jean Michel Jarre, Maurice Béjart, Peter Brook, George Aperghis, Didier Lockwood, Italian singer-songwriter Alice and Michel Portal.

Discography
 Meditation on the Ney (Unesco Collection), 1978
 Whirling Dervishes from Turkey, with Kemal Evren, Tugrul Inancer, Aram Kerovpyan, Muzzffereddîn Ozak, Hafiz Kemâl Ozmutlu, Mahmud Tabrîzîzade, 1981
 Turkey: Art of the Ottoman Tanbur, 1989
 The Mystic Flutes of Sufi: Preludes to Ceremonies of the Whirling Dervishes, with Suleyman Erguner, 1988
 Cérémonie des Derviches Kadiri, 1989
 Fasl Hidjaz Houmayoun, 1990
 Sufi Music of Turkey, with Suleyman Erguner, Mahmoud Tabrizi Zadeh, Bruno Caillat, 1990
 The Turkish Ney, with Salih Dede, Suleyman Erguner, 1990
 Gazel: Classical Sufi Music of the Ottoman Empire, with Husnu Anil, Aziz Bahriyeli, Yusuf Bilgin, Mehmet Emin Bitmez, Suleyman Erguner, Hasan Esen, Fevzi Misir, Walter Quintus, Kurt Renker, 1991
 Ottoman Classical Music, with Gilles Andrieux, 1992
 Peshrev & Semai of Tanburi Djemil Bey, with Walter Quintus, 1994
 L'Orient de L'Occident: Flamenco & Ottoman Sufi Music, with Yusuf Bilgin. Mehmet Emin Bitmez, Bruno Caillat, Pedro Soler, 1995
 The Sacred Flute of the Whirling Dervishes, 1996
 Works of Kemani Tatyos Efendi, with Husnu Anil, Mehmet Emin Bitmez, Suleyman Erguner, Necip Gulses, Dogan Hosses, Sükrü Kabaci, Baki Kemanci, 1996
 Vocal Masterpieces of Kemani Tatyos Efendi, with Husnu Anil, Suleyman Erguner, Necip Gulses, Dogan Hosses, Sükrü Kabaci, Baki Kemanci, 1996
 Psalms of Yunus Emre, with Yusuf Bilgin, Bruno Caillat, 1997
 Chemins, with Pierre Rigopoulos, Martin Saint-Pierre, Derya Turkan, 1997
 Music from the Arabian Nights, with Bruno Caillat, Tabrizi Mahmoud Zadeh, 1999
 Ottomania, with Walter Quintus, 1999
 Islam Blues, with Bruno Caillat, Renaud Garcia-Fons, Nguyên Lê, Derya Turkan, Mark Nauseef, Yunus Balcioglu, Halil Neciboglu, Walter Quintus, 2001
 Taj Mahal, with Bruno Caillat, Sultan Khan, Fazal Qureshi, Derya Turkan, Ken Zukerman, 2001
 Nazım Hikmet – Şair Cenazesi, 2002
 Gazing Point, with Markus Stockhausen, Mark Nauseef, Walter Quintus, 2003
 No Matter, with Markus Stockhausen, Mark Nauseef, Bill Laswell, Walter Quintus, 2008
 Fragments Des Cérémonies Soufies, L'invitation à L'Extase, Kudsi Erguner & Lâmekân Ensemble, Seyir Muzik 2021
With Anouar Brahem
Conte de l'Incroyable Amour (ECM, 1991)

References
 letişim Publications – Biogry of Kudsi Erguner

External links
 NTV News Online – Interview with Kudsi Erguner 

1952 births
Liceo Italiano alumni
Living people
People from Diyarbakır
Ney players
Performers of Sufi music
Turkish musicians
Musicians of Ottoman classical music
Musicians of Turkish makam music
ACT Music artists
Turkish male singers